Feliu or Féliu or Feliú may refer to:

People
Antonio de Olaguer y Feliú (1740–1810), Spanish soldier and politician, Viceroy of the Rio de la Plata and Secretary of War of King Charles IV
Jordi Xumetra Feliú (born 1985), Spanish professional footballer
José Olaguer Feliú (1857–1929), Spanish Lieutenant General, Minister of War and politician
Manuel Olaguer Feliú (1759–1824), Spanish Field Marshal and Captain General of Galicia
Melchor Feliú, appointed governor of Florida in 1762
Núria Feliu (1941–2022), Catalan singer and actress
Feliu Formosa (born 1934), Catalan dramatist, poet and translator
Feliu Ventura (born 1976), singer-songwriter from the País Valencià
Josep Feliú i Codina (1845–1897), Catalan journalist, novelist and playwright

Places
Saint-Féliu-d'Amont, a town and commune in the Pyrénées-Orientales département, in southwestern France
Saint-Féliu-d'Avall, a town and commune in the Pyrénées-Orientales département, in southwestern France
Sant Feliu de Codines, a municipality in the comarca of the Vallès Oriental in Catalonia, Spain
Sant Feliu de Guíxols, a municipality in the comarca of the Baix Empordà in Catalonia, Spain
Sant Feliu de Llobregat, a city and municipality in Catalonia, Spain, in the province of Barcelona

Ecclesiastical regions
Roman Catholic Diocese of Sant Feliu de Llobregat, in the Ecclesiastical province of Barcelona in Spain